Theodor Gomperz (March 29, 1832August 29, 1912), Austrian philosopher and classical scholar, was born at Brno (Brünn).

Biography
Gomperz studied at Brno and at Vienna under Hermann Bonitz. Graduating at the University of Vienna in 1867 he became privatdozent, and subsequently a professor of classical philology (1873). In 1882 he was elected a full member of the Vienna Academy of Sciences. He received the degree of Doctor of Philosophy honoris causa from the University of Königsberg, and Doctor of Literature from the universities of Dublin and Cambridge, and became correspondent for several learned societies.

Gomperz resigned his professorship at Vienna in order to devote all his energy to his magnum opus Griechische Denker ("Greek Thinkers"), which first appeared in 1893.

He died in Baden bei Wien.

Works 
Demosthenes der Staatsmann (1864)
Philodemi de ira liber (1864)
Traumdeutung und Zauberei (1866)
Herculanische Studien (1865–1866)
Beiträge zur Kritik und Erklärung griech. Schriftsteller (7 vols, 1875–1900)
Neue Bruchstücke Epikurs (1876)
Die Bruchstücke der griech. Tragiker und Cobets neueste kritische Manier (1878)
Herodoteische Studien (1883)
Ein bisher unbekannies griech. Schriftsystem (1884)
Zu Philodems Büchern von der Musik (1885)
Über den Abschluß des herodoteischen Geschichtswerkes (1886)
Platonische Aufsätze (3 vols, 1887–1905)
Zu Heraklits Lehre und den Überresten seines Werkes (1887)
Zu Aristoteles' Poëtik (2 parts, 1888–1896)
Über die Charaktere Theophrasts (1888)
Nachlese zu den Bruchstücken der griechischen Tragiker (1888)
Die Apologie der Heilkunst (1890)
Philodem und die ästhetischen Schriften der herculanischen Bibliothek (1891)
Die Schrift vom Staatswesen der Athener (1891)
Die jüngst entdeckten Überreste einer den platonischen Phädon enthaltenden Papyrusrolle (1892)
Aus der Hekale des Kallimachos (1893)
Griechische Denker. Eine Geschichte der antiken Philosophie (Three volumes, 1896, 1902, 1909)
Essays und Erinnerungen (1905)
Die Apologie der Heilkunst. Eine griechische Sophistenrede des 5. vorchristlichen Jahrhunderts (1910)
Hellenika. Eine Auswahl philologischer und philosophiegeschichtlicher kleiner Schriften (1912)

Gomperz supervised a translation of John Stuart Mill's complete works (12 vols., Leipzig, 1869–1880), and wrote a life (Vienna, 1889) of Mill. His Griechische Denker: Geschichte der antiken Philosophie (vols. i. and ii., Leipzig, 1893 and 1902) was translated into English by L. Magnus (vol. i., 1901). Volumes ii & iii were translated into English by G. G. Berry.

Lewis Campbell gives an overview of Gomperz as writer and scholar in The Hibbert Journal, 5:2, January 1907, pp. 439–448.

References

External links 
 Greek Thinkers Vol. I
 Greek Thinkers Vol. II
 Greek Thinkers Vol. III

1832 births
1912 deaths
Burials at Döbling Cemetery
Writers from Brno
People from the Margraviate of Moravia
Austrian Jews
Austrian classical scholars
20th-century Austrian philosophers
Jewish philosophers
Scholars of ancient Greek philosophy
Classical scholars of the University of Vienna
Moravian Jews
Corresponding Fellows of the British Academy
19th-century Austrian philosophers